Shepard & Stearns was an architecture partnership that operated in Boston and greater New England.

Its principal partners were George F. Shepard and Frederic B. Stearns (1874–1959). They worked together starting in 1913 although the firm was not formally established until 1921. One of their first works together was the Suburban Club.

A number of its works survive and are listed on the U.S. National Register of Historic Places.

Works by either partner or the firm include (with variations in attribution):
Birdwood, Millpond Rd. and Pinetree Blvd. Thomasville, GA (Shepard & Stearns), NRHP-listed
YWCA Boston, 140 Clarendon St. Boston, MA (Shepard, George F.& Frederic Stearns), NRHP-listed
Marlborough Brook Filter Beds, Framingham Rd., Southborough and Marlborough, MA (Stearns, Frederic B.)
Quinepoxet River Bridge, Thomas St. over the Quinepoxet River at the Wachusett Reservoir West Boylston, MA (Stearns, Frederic B.)
Suburban Club, 6 Suburban Ave./580 Main St. Stamford, CT (Stearns, Frederic B.; George F. Shepard) 
Wachusett Aqueduct Linear District, Along Wachusett Aqueduct from Wachusett Reservoir to Sudbury Reservoir - Berlin, Clinton, Marlborough, Northborough, Southborough, MA (Stearns, Frederic B.)
Weston Aqueduct Linear District, Along Weston Aqueduct from Sudbury Reservoir to Weston Reservoir, in Framingham, Southborough, Wayland, and Weston, MA (Stearns, Frederic B.), NRHP-listed
Faxon House, 310 Adams St. Quincy, MA (Shephard & Stearns), NRHP-listed
Munroe Building, 1227–1259 Hancock St. Quincy, MA (Shephard & Stearns), NRHP-listed 
Quincy Electric Light and Power Company Station, 76 Field St. Quincy, MA (Shephard & Stearns), NRHP-listed 
South Junior High School, 444 Granite St. Quincy, MA (Shephard & Stearns), NRHP-listed

References

Architecture firms of the United States
Architecture firms based in Massachusetts